Dr. Meghnad Saha Institute of Technology , established in 1998,  is a government polytechnic and degree engineering institute; located in Haldia,  Purba Medinipur district, West Bengal. This polytechnic is affiliated to the West Bengal State Council of Technical Education,  and recognised by AICTE, New Delhi. This polytechnic offers diploma courses in Electrical, Electronics & Instrumentation, Computer Science & Technology, Chemical, Petro Chemical, Mechanical  and Civil Engineering.

References

External links
 Admission to Polytechnics in West Bengal for Academic Session 2006-2007
http://www.drmsithaldia.org/index.html

Universities and colleges in Purba Medinipur district
Educational institutions established in 1998
1998 establishments in West Bengal
Technical universities and colleges in West Bengal